Leyla Yashar gizi Abdullayeva (1981, Baku) is an Azerbaijani diplomat, the Head of the Press Service of the Ministry of Foreign Affairs of the Republic of Azerbaijan.

Biography 
Leyla Abdullayeva was born in 1981 in Baku. She studied at Baku State University, Faculty of International Law and International Relations, bachelor's and master's degrees in international relations.

Since 2002, Abdullayeva has held diplomatic positions in various departments of the Foreign Ministry, in the Representations of the Republic of Azerbaijan to NATO, the Embassy of Azerbaijan in the Kingdom of Belgium and European Union. She previously worked at the Foreign Ministry as Deputy Director of the Azerbaijan International Development Agency (AIDA).

On October 4, 2018, Leyla Abdullayeva was appointed the Head of the Press Service of the Ministry of Foreign Affairs of Azerbaijan.

On October 17, 2022, Leyla Abdullayeva was appointed Ambassador of Azerbaijan to the French Republic.

Awards 
 Medal "For Distinction in Diplomatic Service" — July 9, 2018

References 

Baku State University alumni
Azerbaijani women diplomats
1981 births
Azerbaijani politicians
Living people